William Rhett Hickman (born September 7, 1952) is an American politician from Georgia. Hickman is a Republican member of the Georgia State Senate for District 4.

References

Republican Party Georgia (U.S. state) state senators
21st-century American politicians
Living people
1952 births